John Meredith Read Sr. (July 21, 1797 – November 29, 1874) was an American lawyer, jurist, and politician from Philadelphia, Pennsylvania. He was one of the founders of the Republican Party and chief justice of the Pennsylvania Supreme Court.

Early life
Read John was born on Chestnut Street across the street from Independence Hall, the eldest son of lawyer John Read and Martha Meredith Read. Both of his grandfathers (George Read and Samuel Meredith) had served in the Continental Congress. After an education at home, Read graduated from the University of Pennsylvania, then read law, and was admitted to the bar in 1818. He started a law practice in Philadelphia.

Political career
Read began his political career when he was elected to the Pennsylvania House of Representatives in 1822. He served until 1824 while remaining in the private practice of law. After this he served on the Philadelphia City Council, and for several years was the city's solicitor. Although his family had been Federalists, he became an ardent supporter of the Free Soil wing of the Democratic Party.

From 1837 to 1841, Read was the United States Attorney for the Eastern District of Pennsylvania. In 1845, President John Tyler nominated him to the Supreme Court of the United States; but, his earlier stance against the expansion of slavery into the territories caused the southern Democratic Senators to oppose his nomination and it was withdrawn. From June until December 1845 he served as the Attorney General of Pennsylvania.

In 1863, he was elected as a member to the American Philosophical Society.

Read became an early supporter and organizer for the Republican Party. When they won in their first statewide races in 1858, Read was elected to the state supreme court. He then served until December 2, 1872, the last year as chief justice. When the Republicans held their first national convention at Philadelphia in 1856, Read was a convention organizer and delivered the convention keynote address. At the 1860 Republican Convention in Chicago, he received one vote on the first ballot for presidential nominee; still, he supported Lincoln as the nominee.

Family
Read was married twice, first to Priscilla Marshall in 1828. They had five children. After Priscilla's death, Read married Amelia Thompson in 1855. Read died at home in Philadelphia in 1874. His son, J. Meredith Read, was a noted American diplomat.

References

External links
The John Meredith Read papers, which include materials covering his legal and political careers, are available for research use at the Historical Society of Pennsylvania

1797 births
1874 deaths
Chief Justices of Pennsylvania
Lawyers from Philadelphia
Members of the Pennsylvania House of Representatives
Pennsylvania Democrats
Pennsylvania Republicans
Philadelphia City Council members
Justices of the Supreme Court of Pennsylvania
United States Attorneys for the Eastern District of Pennsylvania
United States federal judges admitted to the practice of law by reading law
Unsuccessful nominees to the United States Supreme Court
19th-century American politicians
19th-century American judges
19th-century American lawyers